Ernst Levy (18 November 1895 – 19 April 1981) was a Swiss musicologist, composer, pianist and conductor.

Life
Born in Basel, Switzerland, Levy studied with Egon Petri and Raoul Pugno.

David Dubal describes him as an "unusual and powerful pianist" who made "grandly conceived" recordings of the late Beethoven sonatas and captured "the very essence of the Faustian Liszt".  His work as a musicologist and teacher brought him to the United States, where he taught at colleges including the Massachusetts Institute of Technology, the University of Chicago and the New England Conservatory; he also became a United States citizen. His students included composer Hazel Ghazarian Skaggs. In 1966, he retired from academia and returned to his native Switzerland where he spent the remainder of his life. He died in Morges.

Levy's book A Theory of Harmony was published in 1985 and, among other modern compositional concepts, describes the composer's concept of harmonic "undertones".

Levy's son was composer and cellist Frank Ezra Levy (1930–2017).

Selected compositions
Orchestral
 Symphony No. 2 in D major (1922)
 Symphony No. 3 (1922)
 Symphony No. 7 (1937)
 Symphony No. 8 (1937)
 Symphony No. 10 "France" (1944)
 Symphony No. 11 (1949)
 Symphony No. 12 (1951)
 Symphony No. 13 (1955)
 Third Suite for orchestra (1957)
 Fourth Suite for orchestra (1959)
 Symphony No. 14 (1962)
 Symphony No. 15 (1968)
Concertante
 Concerto for cello and orchestra (1947)
Chamber music
 String Quartet No. 1 (1919)
 Sonata No. 1 for violin and piano (1932)
 Divertimento for clarinet (or oboe) and piano (1952)
 Theme and Transformations for clarinet and piano (1952)
 String Trio No. 1 (1953)
 Sonata for cello and piano (1953)
 Sonata for horn and Piano (1953)
 Fifteen Little Pieces for cello solo (1955)
 Piano Quartet (1956)
 Suite for viola or cello solo (1956)
 Suite for violin solo (1960)
 String Trio No. 2 (1960)
 Sonata No. 2 for violin and piano (1961)
 Sonata No. 3 for violin and piano (1963)
 Sonatina No. 1 for violin and piano (1962)
 Sonatina No. 2 for violin and piano (1962)
 Suite for 2 violas (1963)
 Trio for clarinet, cello and piano (1963)
 Sonata for three violin parts (1965)
 String Trio No. 3 (1966)
 Trio for clarinet, viola and piano (1968)
 Trio No. 2 for clarinet, violin and piano (1970)
 Suite No. 2 for viola solo (1971)
 Soliloquy for clarinet solo (1971)
 Concerto sur "Auprès de ma blonde" for trumpet and piano (1975)
 Threnodie for viola, cello and organ (1975)
 Sonata for 2 violins and piano (1977)
 Intermezzo idilliaco for clarinet and piano (1978)
 String Trio No. 4 (1978)
 String Quartet No. 4 (1978)
 String Quartet No. 5 (1978)
 Sonata for viola and piano (1979)
 Trio for violin, cello and piano (1979)
 Sonata Accompagnata for bassoon and piano or orchestra (1980)
Keyboard
 Fantaisie symphonique for harpsichord (1939)
 Ricercar for harpsichord (1960)
 Meditation on a Hebrew Raga for organ (1961)
 Study on the Whole-Tone Scales for piano (1971)
 Piano Sonata No. 1 (1973)
 Piano Sonata No. 2 (1974)
 Piano Sonata No. 3 (1975)
 Piano Sonata No. 4 (1976)
 Piano Sonata No. 5 (1977)
 Piano Sonata No. 6 (1979)
 Piano Sonata No. 7 (1981)
 Hommage romantique for piano (1977)
 Fantaisie dialoguée for organ and piano (1980)
Vocal
 Gaudeamus, Cantata for mixed chorus, wind orchestra and timpani (1964)
 Li T'ai Po's Answer for tenor, string orchestra and flute (1979)
 Eins und Alles for baritone and string orchestra (1980); words by Johann Wolfgang von Goethe

Academic works

References

External links
 Ernst Levy's official website (created under support of his son, Frank Ezra Levy)
 Guide to the Ernst Levy Papers 1919-2004 at the University of Chicago Special Collections Research Center 
Sound recordings of works of the composer from the archives of Swiss Radio SRG SSR on Neo.Mx3

1895 births
1981 deaths
20th-century classical composers
20th-century classical pianists
20th-century conductors (music)
20th-century male musicians
20th-century musicologists
Jewish classical pianists
Male classical pianists
Male conductors (music)
Musicians from Basel-Stadt
Pupils of Egon Petri
Swiss classical composers
Swiss classical pianists
Swiss conductors (music)
Swiss male classical composers
Swiss musicologists
20th-century Swiss composers